The 1980 United States presidential debates were a series of debates held for the presidential election. The League of Women Voters organized two presidential debates: the first on September 21, 1980, and the second on October 28, 1980. The second presidential debate is the second most-watched debate in American history.

The Republican nominee Ronald Reagan participated in both debates. Independent candidate John B. Anderson only participated in the first debate, while the Democratic nominee and incumbent President Jimmy Carter participated in the second debate.

League of Women Voters-sponsored debates

Negotiations
The tentative schedule for the debates, reported in August 1980, was as follows:
 September 18, in Baltimore, Maryland
 October 2, in Louisville, Kentucky (Vice Presidential debate)
 October 13, in Portland, Oregon
 October 27, in Cleveland, Ohio

The 1980 election featured a major third party candidate, John B. Anderson. The League of Women Voters allowed for Anderson to participate in the debate if he polled above 15%.

The Carter campaign, believing that a three-way debate between Carter, Reagan, and Anderson would boost Anderson's campaign, tried to push for an earlier debate only featuring Carter and Reagan This plan was supported by the chairs of the Democratic and Republican National Committee. The two-person debate did not materialize, and Carter declined to debate alongside Anderson.

The Vice Presidential debate was cancelled on September 29, days before it was scheduled to be held. George H. W. Bush and Walter Mondale refused to attend, leaving only Anderson's running mate Patrick Lucey accepting the invitation.

Debate list

First presidential debate (Baltimore Convention Center)

The first presidential debate was held on September 21 at the Baltimore Convention Center. The three invitees were Jimmy Carter, John B. Anderson and Ronald Reagan, though Carter refused to attend due to the presence of Anderson.

Following a strong performance by Reagan, Anderson's poll numbers began to drop; he would not be invited to the second debate.

Format
The debate started at 10:00 p.m. EDT, and lasted for one hour. Anderson and Reagan both received six questions. They were given two and a half minutes to answer each question, as well as one minute and 15 seconds to rebut. Closing statements could be as long as three minutes.

Second presidential debate (Music Hall)

The second debate was held on October 28 in Cleveland, Ohio's Music Hall. The debate was held only a week before Election Day.

Carter and Reagan were the only invitees. CNN attempted to include Anderson from the Constitution Hall in Washington, D.C. CNN's Daniel Schorr read the same questions to Anderson. They then aired Anderson's live responses along with tape delay of Carter and Reagan's responses, despite technical difficulties.

Reagan's most notable moments include using the phrase "There you go again" and asking whether or not Americans were better off than they were four years ago.

In 1983, Reagan's team came under fire for having access to Carter's internal debate briefing materials.

Format
The second presidential debate started at 9:30 p.m. EST, and lasted for 90 minutes. The debate consisted of two halves, and panelists were only allowed to offer follow-ups in the first half. Candidates Carter and Reagan both received the same 12 questions and the ability to rebut twice for one minute each.

Viewership
Nielsen Media Research states that the second presidential debate garnered 80.6 million viewers. It was the most-watched debate in American history until the first presidential debate of 2016.

Reaction
An unscientific televote poll carried out by ABC immediately after the debate received about 650,000 responses, two thirds in favor of Reagan.

Other debates
A minor party debate was held by the New York Committee for Marxist Education on October 9. The debate was moderated by Bill Henning, and attended by representatives of Communist Party USA, Socialist Workers Party, Socialist Party U.S.A., Citizens Party, and Workers World Party. The only candidate to attend in person was Workers World's Deirdre Griswold.

References

1980
Debates